is a Japanese actor, voice actor and singer from Fukuoka Prefecture, Japan. He is best known for voicing the roles of Sagara Sanosuke in Rurouni Kenshin, Akito Tenkawa in Martian Successor Nadesico, Takeshi/Brock and Sonansu/Wobbuffet in Pokémon, Horohoro in Shaman King, Johannes Krauser II in Detroit Metal City, Keitarō Urashima in Love Hina, Shiro Iori in Kill la Kill, and Yousuke Fuuma in Wedding Peach.

Biography
He was born in Fukuoka as 上田祐司 (same pronunciation). In July 2004, he left Arts Vision and officially made his name into an all-hiragana form. In April 2005, Ueda joined Office Osawa.

Yūji is frequently called "Yū-chan" by veteran voice actresses; usually co-voice actresses from Pokémon.

He is married to voice actress Omi Minami. In March 2012, Ueda and Minami both left Osawa, and launched a new agency called PomaRancz.

Filmography

Television animation
1992
Calimero – Giuliano
1994
Blue Seed – Yoshiki Yaegashi
Tokimeki Memorial – Yoshio Saotome 
1995
Bonobono – Yama-Ō
Fushigi Yūgi – Amiboshi, Suboshi
Wedding Peach – Yousuke Fuuma
1996
The Vision of Escaflowne – Reeden
Martian Successor Nadesico – Akito Tenkawa
Rurouni Kenshin – Sagara Sanosuke
Violinist of Hameln – Hamel
Chouja Reideen - Masato Tsubaki
1997
BØY – Kiyoshirō Okamoto
Pokémon – Takeshi (Brock), Barri-chan (Mimey), Zippo
Don't Leave Me Alone, Daisy – Kuma
1998
Bakusō Kyōdai Let's & Go!! – Hitoshi Matsu
Bubblegum Crisis Tokyo 2040 – Daly Wong
Case Closed – Shigehisa Noguchi
Di Gi Charat – Abarenbō
Digimon Adventure – Numemon
Eat-Man '98 – Larry
Fancy Lala – Yoshio
Flint the Time Detective – Dino Fishman
Sexy Commando Gaiden: Sugoiyo! Masaru-san – Masaru Hananakajima
Super Yo-Yo – Seito Houjouin
Ojarumaru – Kisuke, Okorinbou
1999
Black Heaven – Michael Sato
Dai-Guard – Matsutouya
Dr. Slump – Akira Toriyama
Eden's Bowy – Spike Randit
Pocket Monsters: Episode Orange Archipelago – Takeshi (Brock),  Barri-chan (Mimey)
Pocket Monsters: Episode Gold & Silver – Takeshi (Brock), Musashi's Sonansu (Jessie's Wobbuffet), Satoshi's Hinoarashi (Ash's Cyndaquil), Satoshi's Yorunozuku (Ash's Noctowl), Barri-chan (Mimey), Zippo
Trouble Chocolate – Ham Ham, Spider Monster
Zoids – Karl Schubaltz
2000
Boys Be... – Tsuyoshi Ueno
Hand Maid May – Kōtarō Nanbara
Love Hina – Keitarō Urashima
Mon Colle Knights – Tanaka
2001
Chance Pop Session – Muraki
Earth Maiden Arjuna – Chris Hawken
Fruits Basket – Makoto Takei
I My Me! Strawberry Eggs – Tofu Tofukuji, Akira Fukae
Inuyasha – Hōjō
PaRappa the Rapper – Shop Manager
Prétear – Kaoru Awayuki
Project ARMS – Takeshi Tomoe
Sadamitsu the Destroyer – Sadamitsu Tsubaki
Samurai – Kurikichi
Shaman King – Horokeu Usui (a.k.a. Horohoro), Hang Zang-Ching
Shingu: Secret of the Stellar Wars – Hachiyou Tsunamori
X/1999 – Kakyo Kuzuki
2002
A Cheeky Angel – Tasuke Yasuda
Chobits – Hiroyasu Ueda
Heat Guy J – Kia Freeborn
Panyo Panyo Di Gi Charat – Deji Devil
Pocket Monsters Side Stories – Takeshi (Brock), Musashi's Sonansu (Jessie's Wobbuffet), Satoshi's Hinoarashi (Ash's Cyndaquil), Satoshi's Yorunozuku (Ash's Noctowl), Barri-chan (Mimey), Zippo
Pocket Monsters: Advanced Generation – Takeshi (Brock), Musashi's Sonansu (Jessie's Wobbuffet), Satoshi's Kimori/Juputor/Jukain (Ash's Treecko/Grovyle/Sceptile) Satoshi's Hinoarashi (Ash's Cyndaquil), Satoshi's Yorunozuku (Ash's Noctowl), Barri-chan (Mimey), Harley's Nokutas (Harley's Cacturne)
Love Hina Again – Keitaro Urashima
Rockman EXE – Yuuichiro, Higure, Coloredman, 'Numberman
The Twelve Kingdoms – Ikuya Asano
Witch Hunter Robin – Juzo Narumi
2003
Cromartie High School – Jun Ishikawa
Full Metal Panic? Fumoffu – Fuwa-senpai, Mori
GetBackers – Yuuji Takamura
Konjiki no Gash Bell!! – Karudio
One Piece – Sarquiss, Stainless
Peacemaker Kurogane – Tatsunosuke
Stellvia of the Universe – Pierre Takida
2004
Bleach – Sora Inoue
Burst Angel – Kyohei Tachibana
Diamond Daydreams – Mitsuru Shiraishi
Fullmetal Alchemist – Solf J. Kimblee, Roa
Genshiken – Chairman
Ghost in the Shell: Stand Alone Complex 2nd GIG – Ueda
Inuyasha – Akitoki Hōjō
Midori Days – Shuichi Takamizawa
My-HiME – Masashi Takeda
The Prince of Tennis – Jiro Akutagawa
Doki Doki School Hours – Yūichi Kudō
Yu-Gi-Oh! Duel Monsters GX – Mitsuru Ayanokouji, Kozaky
2005
Aria the Animation – Udo "Woody" Ayanokoji the 51st
Black Jack – Tanikawa
Buzzer Beater – DT
Elemental Gelade – Rowen
Emma - A Victorian Romance – Hakim Atawari
Fighting Beauty Wulong – Takuro Kaburagi
Gag Manga Biyori – Opening song performer and various characters
Hell Girl – Hajime Shibata
Honey and Clover – Shinobu Morita
Mushishi – Adashino
2006
009-1 – Doctor Green
Aria the Natural – Udo "Woody" Ayanokoji the 51st
Gag Manga Biyori 2 – Pensuke
Galaxy Angel Rune – Denish
Ghost Slayers Ayashi – Kumoshichi
Ouran High School Host Club – Nekozawa Umehito
Pokémon: The Mastermind of Mirage Pokémon – Takeshi (Brock)
Pocket Monsters: Diamond & Pearl – Takeshi (Brock), Musashi's Sonansu (Jessie's Wobbuffet), Satoshi's Jukain (Ash's Sceptile), Satoshi's Mokazaru/Gokazaru (Ash's Monferno/Infernape), Satoshi's Hinoarashi/Magmarashi (Ash's Cyndaquil/Quilava), Satoshi's Yorunozuku (Ash's Noctowl), Shinji's Glion (Paul's Gliscor), Shinji's Būbā/Būburn (Paul's Magmar/Magmortar), Jun's Sawamura (Barry's Hitmonlee)
Project Blue: Chikyū SOS – James
The Third – Toy Joey
2007
Case Closed – Inagaki Hiromasa
D.Gray-man – Selim
Devil May Cry – Kerry
Mobile Suit Gundam 00 – Billy Katagiri
Moetan – Naoto "Nao-kun" Tezuka
Oh! Edo Rocket – Ears
You're Under Arrest: Full Throttle – Staff
2008
Aria the Originator – Udo "Woody" Ayanokoji the 51st
Glass Maiden – Akira
Gunslinger Girl -Il Teatrino- – Cristiano
Kannagi: Crazy Shrine Maidens – Hagashima
2009
Battle Spirits: Shonen Gekiha Dan – Magical Crown
Darker than Black: Gemini of the Meteor – Ilya Sokoloff
Fullmetal Alchemist: Brotherhood – Jean Havoc, Bido
Golgo 13 – Danielle's Pimp
Rideback – Haruki Hishida
Tears to Tiara – Lector
2010
Durarara!! – Takashi Nasujima
Sgt. Frog – Darere
Inuyasha: The Final Act - Hōjō
2011
Blade – Agus
Chihayafuru – Shinichi Murao
Gosick – Simon Hunt
Yondemasuyo, Azazel-san – Fujisaki
2012
Pocket Monsters: Best Wishes! Season 2 – Shizui (Marlon)
2013
Chiharafuru 2 – Shinichi MuraoGundam Build Fighters – Mario & Julio RenatoHunter × Hunter (2011) – Shoot McMahonKill la Kill – Shirō IoriPocket Monsters: Best Wishes! Season 2: Episode N – Takeshi (Brock)Pocket Monsters: Best Wishes! Season 2: Decolora Adventure – Musashi's Sonansu (Jessie's Wobbuffet), Barri-chan (Mimey)Pocket Monsters: XY – Musashi's Sonansu (Jessie's Wobbuffet), Satoshi's Keromatsu/Gekogashira (Ash's Froakie/Frogadier), Monsieur Pierre's Kureffi (Monsieur Pierre's Klefki), Shōta's Kimori/Juputoru (Sawyer's Treecko/Grovyle)Robotics;Notes – MaguyanSaint Seiya Omega – Mira
2014Hanayamata – Hana's FatherTokyo Ghoul – Itsuki Marude
2015Beautiful Bones: Sakurako's Investigation – Father TominagaDD Fist of the North Star II – FudōPocket Monsters: XY&Z – Musashi's Sonansu (Jessie's Wobbuffet), Satoshi's Gekogashira/Gekkoga (Ash's Frogadier/Greninja), Monsieur Pierre's Kureffi (Monsieur Pierre's Klefki), Shōta's Juputoru/Jukain (Sawyer's Grovyle/Sceptile)Samurai Warriors – Maeda KeijiSaint Seiya: Soul of Gold – Tanngrisnir HerculesShow by Rock!! – Maple ArisugawaTokyo Ghoul √A – Itsuki MarudeSeiyu's Life! – Manager of Voice EntertainmentOne-Punch Man – Watch Dog ManUshio to Tora – Kappa
2016Battle Spirits Double Drive – AzasuNobunaga no Shinobi – Saitō TatsuokiPocket Monsters: Sun & Moon – Takeshi (Brock), Musashi's Sonansu (Jessie's Wobbuffet), Māmane's Kuwagannon (Sophocles's Vikavolt), Barri-chan (Mimey), Lychee's Rugarugan (Olivia's Lycanroc), Māmane's father (Sophocles' father)
2017Kirakira PreCure a la Mode – GummyMarch Comes in Like a Lion – Eisaku NoguchiPuri-Puri Chiichan – Doctor Hatena
2018Hi Score Girl – Blanka
2019Mob Psycho 100 II – Red RaincoatOne-Punch Man 2 – Watch Dog ManCautious Hero: The Hero Is Overpowered but Overly Cautious – Deathmagla
2020
 Deca-Dence – Sarkozy
2021Shaman King (2021) – Horokeu Usui (a.k.a. Horohoro)

OVADirty Pair Flash (1994) – OperatorFobia (1995) – Mutsumi NaritaMagic User's Club (1996) – Akane's Boyfriend #3Master of Mosquiton (1996) – HonooVery Private Lesson (1998) – Arihiko TairakuSol Bianca: The Legacy (1999) – PercyAngel Sanctuary (2000) – Yue KatouRurouni Kenshin: Seisōhen (2001) – Sagara SanosukeDigital Juice (2002) – ChickenFutari Ecchi (2002) – Makoto OnodaNurse Witch Komugi (2002) – Mugi-maruAkane Maniax (2004) – Andorō UmedaAyashi Divine Comedy (2007) – KumoshichiDetroit Metal City (2008) – Johannes Krauser II

Theatrical animationPocket Monsters films (1998–) – Takeshi (Brock), Musashi's Sonans (Jessie's Wobbuffet)Escaflowne (2000) – ReedenOjarumaru the Movie: The Promised Summer - Ojaru and Semira (2000) – KisukeCowboy Bebop: Knockin' on Heaven's Door (2001) – Lee SampsonDigimon Frontier: Island of Lost Digimon (2002) – DinohyumonInuyasha the Movie: The Castle Beyond the Looking Glass (2002) – Hojo, Akitoki HojoEyeshield 21: The Phantom Golden Bowl (2003) – Tarō RaimonDōbutsu no Mori (2006) – SakurajimaOblivion Island: Haruka and the Magic Mirror (2009) – PicantaMobile Suit Gundam 00 the Movie: A Wakening of the Trailblazer (2010) – Billy Katagiri

TokusatsuTokusou Robo Janperson (1993) – Robot Angel (ep. 15)Kaitou Sentai Lupinranger VS Keisatsu Sentai Patranger (2018) – Destra Majjo (eps. 1 – 7, 9 – 11, 13 – 15, 17 – 18, 20 – 23,  25 – 26, 28 – 30, 32, 34 – 36, 38 – 39, 41 – 42)Kaitou Sentai Lupinranger VS Keisatsu Sentai Patranger en Film  (2018) – Destra MajjoMashin Sentai Kiramager (2020) - Stove Jamen (eps. 7-8)

Games
 EVE Burst Error (1997) – Susumu Nikaido
 Capcom vs. SNK: Millennium Fight 2000 (2000) – Blanka, Balrog/Vega
 Capcom vs. SNK 2: Millionaire Fighting 2001 (2001) – Blanka, Balrog/Vega
 Everybody's Golf 5 (2007) – Kid/Felipe
 Galaxy Angel (2002) – Takuto Meyers
 Galaxy Angel: Moonlit Lovers (2003) – Takuto Meyers
 Galaxy Angel: Eternal Lovers (2004) – Takuto Meyers
 Galaxy Angel II ~Zettai Ryouiki no Tobira~ (2006) – Takuto Meyers
 Galaxy Angel II ~Mugen Kairou no Kagi~ (2007) – Takuto Meyers
 Growlanser – Oscar Reeves
 Growlanser II: The Sense of Justice – Oscar Reeves
 Guilty Gear XX (2002) – Zappa
 Final Fantasy XIII (2009) – Amodar
 Final Fantasy XIII-2 (2011) – Amodar
 Lego Batman 3: Beyond Gotham (2014) – Saint Walker
 Marvel vs. Capcom: Clash of Super Heroes (1998) – Strider Hiryu, Jin Saotome
 Marvel vs. Capcom 2: New Age of Heroes (2000) – Strider Hiryu, Jin Saotome
 Megami Ibunroku Persona – (Masao 'Mark' Inaba)
 Namco × Capcom (2005) – Krino Sandra, Zabel Zarock/Lord Raptor
 Nana (PS2) (2005) – Kyosuke Takakura
 Project X Zone (2012) – Zabel Zarock/Lord Raptor
 Project X Zone 2 (2015) – Zabel Zarock/Lord RaptorRockman X7 (Tornado Debonion)Rockman ZX (Purprill the Mandroid)
 Rival Schools series (1998) – Shoma Sawamura
 Samurai Warriors – Maeda Keiji, Sasaki Kojirō
 Shikigami no Shiro – Roger Sasuke
 Star Ocean: The Second Story – Claude C. Kenni
 Street Fighter Zero 3 (1998) – Blanka, Balrog/Vega
 Street Fighter III 2nd Impact: Giant Attack (1997) – Urien
 Street Fighter IV (2008) – Blanka
 Street Fighter V (2016) – Blanka
 Street Fighter 6 (2023) – Blanka
 Super Street Fighter IV (2009) – Blanka
 Street Fighter X Tekken (2012) – Blanka
 Super Robot Wars Impact (Akito Tenkawa)
 Super Robot Wars MX (Akito Tenkawa)
 Super Robot Wars A Portable (Akito Tenkawa)
 2nd Super Robot Wars Z (Crow/Crowe Brust)
 Super Robot Wars BX (Akito Tenkawa)
 Super Smash Bros. for Nintendo 3DS and Wii U – Greninja
 Super Smash Bros. Ultimate - Greninja
 Summon Night Craft Sword Monogatari: Hajimari no Ishi – Tram
 Tales of Innocence – Spada Belforma/Durandal
 Tokimeki Memorial – Yoshio Saotome
 Tokimeki Memorial Girl's Side: 2nd Kiss – Motoharu Masaki
 Ultimate Marvel vs. Capcom 3 (2011) – Strider Hiryu
 Vampire: The Night Warriors(1994) – Zabel Zarock/Lord Raptor, Rikuo/Aulbath, Jon Talbain/Gallon
 Vampire Hunter: Darkstalkers' Revenge (1995) – Zarbel Zarock/Lord Raptor, Rikuo/Aulbath, Jon Talbain/Gallon
 Vampire Savior: The Lord of Vampire (1997) – Zarbel Zarock/Lord Raptor, Rikuo/Aulbath, Jon Talbain/Gallon
 Xenogears – Billy Lee Black

Drama CDsMainichi Seiten! series 2: Kodomo wa Tomaranai (Tatsuya-fishmonger)
 Setsunai Koi Daze – Wataru Shinjou
 Shiawase ni Shite Agemasu – Toshiyuki Oosawa
 Solid Love – Kei Oujisawa

Dubbing roles

Live-actionAnna and the Apocalypse – Arthur Savage (Paul Kaye)I Still Know What You Did Last Summer – Darick the Dockhand (Benjamin Brown)The Matrix – Mouse (Matt Doran)Saturday Night Fever – Bobby C. (Barry Miller)

Animation
 Ozzy & Drix'' – Osmosis Jones

References

See also
Official agency profile 

1967 births
Living people
Male voice actors from Fukuoka Prefecture
Voice actors from Kitakyushu
Japanese male video game actors
Japanese male voice actors
Arts Vision voice actors
20th-century Japanese male actors 
21st-century Japanese male actors